Damion Darrel Warren (born 21 September 1980), best known as Teacha Dee, is a Jamaican reggae singer and former educator. He is best known for his hit singles "Smoke and Fly", "Reggae Souljahs" and "Smuggling Weed". He was a full-time employee for the Ministry of Education Youth and Culture in Jamaica when he recorded all three songs. His stage name was derived from the Jamaican creole for "teacher" and a shortening of his childhood nickname "Demus".

Early life and education
Warren was born on 21 September 1980 in Westmoreland, Jamaica. He grew up in a little district called Bath where he attended the Unity Primary School. Being successful in his Common Entrance Exams, he was rewarded a place at the prestigious Manning's School from which he graduated in 1997 before relocating to Montego Bay to live with his mother. Warren then attended the Sam Sharpe Teachers College, where he attained a Diploma in Education at the  secondary level.

Teaching career
In September 2000, Warren was employed by the Ministry of Education Youth and Culture to teach Mathematics, Integrated Science and Information Communication Technology. He worked at the Glendevon Primary and Junior High School located in Montego Bay, up until his resignation in May 2012, to pursue entertainment.

Music career

2005 - 2010: Early career in Europe and name change
In May 2005, Teacha Dee began his professional career by recording "Life Goes On" for The Mighty Powpow Productions, a major reggae production label based in Germany. This song was sung in the melody of The Beatles hit "[Ob La Di]" and was released in 2006 as part of a compilation project titled "First Sight Riddim". However, "life goes on" was not published under the pseudonym "Teacha Dee" but as his given name, "Damian Warren.

In late 2006, Warren recorded a song titled "Them A Play" which was released on a riddim compilation called Gloria Riddim, produced by Dasvibes also based in Germany. This single was the first song to be officially released under the name "Teacha Dee".

In 2007, he recorded "Smuggling Weed" for Powpow Movements which became his first popular song within the European scene. However, his most successful song at that time was "Smoke and Fly". This was recorded as a sound system dub on the "Kingston Town" instrumental made popular by an Italian reggae superstar Alberto Dascola aka Alborosie. This song" quickly became a sound system's favorite and a huge hit within the reggae clubs.

Early 2008, Teacha Dee recorded "Blaming Game" for Master J Productions, a record label based in Montego Bay, Jamaica. "Blaming Game" was the first single that was in circulation on the radio stations in Jamaica. Prior to this, his music was gaining a lot of attention outside of Jamaica without the knowledge of many Jamaicans and the Ministry of Education. Teacha Dee recorded "Reggae Souljahs" for Rootdown Records later that same year. This song was released on a various artiste compilation called "Ilove Riddim" and it quickly became one of his popular reggae anthems in Germany. In August 2008, Teacha Dee started his own label called "Tenfloor Records" based in Montego Bay, Jamaica.

2010 - 2014: Becoming Rasta and touring Europe 
After some years of study, Teacha Dee accepted the Ras Tafari way of life in June 2010. This brought about a remarkable change in the messages in his music as well as his overall image. In August 2010, he began to focus on his own production company and produced his first collaboration titled "what i pray". This song features 'Determine', an artiste famous for a massive hit with Beenie Man. Teacha Dee released two various artiste compilations quickly after on his label. These were "Hot Box Riddim" and "Thirteen Riddim" both released in late 2010 and early 2011 respectively.

In the summer of 2011, Teacha Dee embarked on his first European tour during his vacation leave from teaching. This tour gave a strong boost to his career on the international scene. The people who loved his songs, could now put a face to his music. His first tour included appearances at Yaam and Insel Clubs in Berlin, Faust in Hannover, Magnapop in Krefeld, Petit Prince and Lüxor in Köln, Rude 7 in Mannheim, Kulturfabrik in Hildeshiem, Wagen Bau in Hamburg and U-club in Wupertal. The highlight of his tour was his performance at the prestigious Reggaejam Festival in Bersenbrück, Germany.

During this trip Teacha Dee recorded for several producers. "Symbiz Productions" based in Germany, "Catchy Grezzly" based in Italy and "Soul Force Music" also based in Germany. In October 2011 immediately after his first tour, Teacha Dee released his debut album entitled "Reggae Souljahs: Beating Babylon With Music". This album was released on his own independent record label.

In April 2012, Teacha Dee returned to Europe for a mini tour. On this trip, he performed in Cantu Italy, Bern Switzerland and Oldenburg Germany. He also did repeated performances in Osnabruck and Mannheim. It was during this time he recorded a collaboration with 'Skarra Mucci' entitled "Summer Time" for "Weedy G SoundForce" a Swiss-based label. This was how his affiliation with Weedy G Soundforce for whom he recorded many singles began. In May 2012, Teacha Dee recorded "Sound System" for Reggaeville/Oneness Productions both based in Germany. He also worked with producers such as "Catchy Greezly" based in Italy, Jugglers Music and Deebuzz Music both based in Germany. A total of 12 singles were released that same year for various producers including his own record label.

In August 2013, Teacha Dee and Utan Green collaborated on a single entitled "Reggae Show" on the " Reggae Jam Riddim" which was released at the 19th staging of the Reggae Jam festival held in Bersenbruck, Germany. Teacha Dee was a headliner for this festival.

2014 - 2017: German reggae charts and sophomore album
On 4 July 2014, "Party Day" recorded for Germany-based upcoming producers "Dancehallrulerz" made it to the number one spot on the official German reggae charts. This chart presented by Jugglerz radio and Riddim Magazine, was the official Reggae chart of Germany. "Party Day" held the number one spot on two separate occasions. It went down the charts for a short time before returning to number one spot a few days later. These charts numbered 30/2014 and 33/2014 were posted on 26 August and 22 September respectively.

In July 2015, Teacha Dee released his first artiste mix-tape titled "Rasta Ting". It consisted of 26 tracks which were released within the European market and was presented by Europe's female sound sensation, Big Mama Sound. In that same month at the 21st staging of the Reggae Jam Festival in Bersenbruck, Teacha Dee's performance was reviewed as "one of the most reviting" by irieites.de. Their list of highlights also included David Rodigan, Anthony B, Alpheus, Ken Boothe, Winston Francis and Bitty McLean.

In 2016, Teacha Dee released a total of ten singles. The most successful of these were; "Jah Jah is calling" on the Pac Man Riddim, "Concrete Grave" on the After Berlin Wall Riddim and "Rastafari Way" on the Horn of Africa Riddim. Teacha Dee's major hit of 2016 was "Rastafari Way" which spent 14 days on Beatport's top 100 reggae/dub chart peaking at 44. Another solid performer was "Concrete Grave" which was selected in the top 100 reggae hits of 2016 by Zonareggae.ro based in Romania.

2017 - Present: Latin American tour and movie placement deal

In July 2017 Reggaeville identified Teacha Dee's performance on Reggaejam as a highlight of the event. Shortly after, he went to Denmark as a headliner and closing act for the Aarhus Reggae Festival held at Voxhall, Aarhus. In July 2018, Teacha Dee was a headliner at the LB27 Reggae Camp Festival held in Cegléd, Hungary.
  
In May 2019 Teacha Dee went on his first Latin American tour, and was one of the headliners on the International Reggae Festival held in Riviera Nayarit, Mexico. This was his closing performance of the Red Jacket Tour, which also had appearances in Spain, Germany, France and Switzerland. 

In February 2021, it was announced that the title track from Teacha Dee's sophomore album Rastafari Way was selected to be featured in No Time to Die. This is the 25th film in the James Bond series produced by Eon Productions. In March 2021 Teacha Dee appeared on VERA, a prestigious talk show hosted by award winning Television Presenter and Actress,Vera Russwurm. This programme was aired on one of the four main Austrian public television channels, ORF 2. There he spoke about Jamaica's long relationship with James Bond and the story behind the song, Rastafari Way.

 Discography 
Albums

 Singles 

 Various Artists Compilations 

{| class="wikitable" style="font-size:95%"
|+ Various Artists Compilations
|-
!Artist
!Title
!Song/s
!Release date
!Label
|-
| align=left  |Various Artists
| align=left  |Gloria Riddim| align=left  |”Them a Play"
| align=left  |2006
| align=left  |Dasvibes
|-
| align=left  |Various Artists
| align=left  |First Sight Riddim| align=left  |"Life Goes On" 
| align=left  |2006
| align=left  |Pow Pow Productions
|-
| align=left  |Various Artists
| align=left  |Wes Roc Riddim| align=left  |”Revolution" 
| align=left  |2007
| align=left  |La Familia Wes
|-
| align=left  |Various Artists
| align=left  |Wild West Riddim| align=left  |”If yuh have it hard"
| align=left  |2007
| align=left  |Master J. Productions
|-
| align=left  |Various Artists
| align=left  |Ovastand Riddim| align=left  |”Smuggling Weed"
| align=left  |2007
| align=left  |Pow Pow Productions
|-
| align=left  |Various Artists
| align=left  |Ice Ice Riddim vol. II| align=left  |”Leading Cause of Death" 
| align=left  |2007
| align=left  |Reggae Town Records
|-
| align=left  |Various Artists
| align=left  |True Life Riddim| align=left  |”Blaming Game" 
| align=left  |2008
| align=left  |Master J Productions
|-
| align=left  |Various Artists
| align=left  |ilove Riddin Pt.2| align=left  |”Reggae Soljahs" 
| align=left  |2008
| align=left  |Rootdown Records
|-
| align=left  |Various Artists
| align=left  |TNT Riddim| align=left  |”The System" 
| align=left  |2009
| align=left  |Dasvibes
|-
| align=left  |Various Artists
| align=left  |Hotbox Riddim| align=left  |”Within My Soul" 
| align=left  |2010
| align=left  |Tenfloor Records
|-
| align=left  |Various Artists
| align=left  |Thirteen Riddim| align=left  |”Everywhere", ”Mr. Thirteen" 
| align=left  |2010
| align=left  |Tenfloor Records
|-
| align=left  |Various Artists
| align=left  |Napoli Riddim| align=left  |”Jah Guide and Keep You"
| align=left  |2012
| align=left  |Vaporetto Sound
|-
| align=left  |Various Artists
| align=left  |Dark Fader Riddim (German Edition)| align=left  |”Rasta Ting"
| align=left  |2012
| align=left  |Boomrush Productions
|-
| align=left  |Various Artists
| align=left  |Dark Fader (Acoustic Edition)| align=left  |”Rasta Ting (Acoustic)”
| align=left  |2012
| align=left  |Boomrush Productions
|-
| align=left  |Various Artists
| align=left  |Reggaeville Riddim| align=left  |”Sound System"
| align=left  |2012
| align=left  |Oneness Records
|-
| align=left  |Various Artists
| align=left  |Sweet Sour Riddim| align=left  |”I Will Try Again"
| align=left  |2012
| align=left  |Greezzly Productions
|-
| align=left  |Various Artists
| align=left  |Roadster Riddim| align=left  |”Welcome to the Summer"(with Skarra Mucci)
| align=left  |2012
| align=left  |Weedy G Soundforce 
|-
| align=left  |Various Artists
| align=left  |Zero Degreez Riddim| align=left  |”Gal Dem Wha We"
| align=left  |2012
| align=left  |Tenfloor Records
|-
| align=left  |Various Artists
| align=left  |Naughty Wifey Riddim| align=left  |”Freedom"
| align=left  |2012
| align=left  |Dee Buzz Sound
|-
| align=left  |Various Artists
| align=left  |Kickdown Riddim| align=left  |”Spliff and Beer"
| align=left  |2012
| align=left  |Jugglerz Records
|-
| align=left  |Various Artists
| align=left  |Jump Up Riddim| align=left  |”Just Weed"
| align=left  |2012
| align=left  |Weedy G Soundforce
|-
| align=left  |Various Artists
| align=left  |Event Riddim| align=left  |”So Me Like It"
| align=left  |2013
| align=left  |Weedy g Soundforce
|-
| align=left  |Various Artists
| align=left  |Love Is Universal Riddim| align=left  |”High Hopes"
| align=left  |2013
| align=left  |Soulove Records
|-
| align=left  |Various Artists
| align=left  |Come Down Again Riddim| align=left  |”Can’t Kill Easy"
| align=left  |2013
| align=left  |Weedy G Soundforce
|-
| align=left  |Various Artists
| align=left  |OneFourFive| align=left  |”All Alone"(with Symbiz)
| align=left  |2013
| align=left  |Rootdown Records
|-
| align=left  |Various Artists
| align=left  |Arise and Shine Riddim| align=left  |”Lady in Black"
| align=left  |2013
| align=left  |Weedy G Soundforce
|-
| align=left  |Various Artists
| align=left  |The War Riddim EP| align=left  |”The Blessings"
| align=left  |2013
| align=left  |Weedy G Soundforce
|-
| align=left  |Various Artists
| align=left  |Blazing Faya Riddim| align=left  |”Change Within"
| align=left  |2013
| align=left  |GMC Music Productions
|-
| align=left  |Various Artists
| align=left  |OneFourFive| align=left  |”All Alone"-(Feat. Symbiz)
| align=left  |2013
| align=left  |Rootdown Records
|-
| align=left  |Various Artists
| align=left  |The Nairobi Riddim| align=left  |”War Big Business"
| align=left  |2013
| align=left  |MKZWO-RECORDS
|-
| align=left  |Various Artists
| align=left  |Big Vibez Riddim| align=left  |”Blaze A Fire"
| align=left  |2013
| align=left  |Weedy G Soundforce/VPAL Music
|-
| align=left  |Various Artists
| align=left  |Reggae Jam Riddim| align=left  |”Reggae Show"-(feat. Utan Green)
| align=left  |2013
| align=left  |House of Riddim Productions
|-
| align=left  |Various Artists
| align=left  |Casiotone Riddim| align=left  |”One Champion"
| align=left  |2013
| align=left  |Weedy G Soundforce
|-
| align=left  |Various Artists
| align=left  |Sleng Teng 2014| align=left  |”Mash Up The Club"
| align=left  |2014
| align=left  |Weedy G Soundforce
|-
| align=left  |Various Artists
| align=left  |New Boxing Riddim| align=left  |”Help"
| align=left  |2014
| align=left  |Soulove Records
|-
| align=left  |Various Artists
| align=left  |Swing Heavy Riddim| align=left  |”Forward Inna Di Dance"-(Feat. Skarra Mucci)
| align=left  |2014
| align=left  |Itation Records/Bizzarri Records
|-
| align=left  |Various Artists
| align=left  |Rise| align=left  |”We Nuh Fraid"-(Feat. Perfect Giddimani)
| align=left  |2014
| align=left  |Weedy G Soundfore/VPAL Music
|-
| align=left  |Various Artists
| align=left  |Boat Riddim| align=left  |”Haters Gwey"
| align=left  |2014
| align=left  |Francesco Salteri (Greezzly Productions)
|-
| align=left  |Various Artists
| align=left  |Sunscreen Riddim Selection| align=left  |”Party Day"
| align=left  |2014
| align=left  |DancehallRulerz
|-
| align=left  |Various Artists
| align=left  |Onion Jerk Riddim| align=left  |”Shell it down"
| align=left  |2014
| align=left  |Bikini Ape
|-
| align=left  |Various Artists
| align=left  |Squeeze Riddim| align=left  |”Evil Ones"
| align=left  |2015
| align=left  |Weedy G Soundforce/VPAL Music
|-
| align=left  |Various Artists
| align=left  |Joyful Soul Riddim| align=left  |”Dwello"
| align=left  |2015
| align=left  |Francesco Salteri (Greezzly Productions)
|-
| align=left  |Various Artists
| align=left  |Better Run Riddim| align=left  |”Medication"-(Feat. Skarra Mucci, Don Tippa)
| align=left  |2015
| align=left  |Dub Inc
|-
| align=left  |Various Artists
| align=left  |Believe Riddim – EP| align=left  |”See Saw"
| align=left  |2015
| align=left  |Sazzah Studio Records
|-
| align=left  |Various Artists
| align=left  |Aquarious Riddim| align=left  |”Easy To Love"
| align=left  |2015
| align=left  |Francesco Salteri (Greezzly Productions)
|-
| align=left  |Various Artists
| align=left  |Surfer’s Big Wave Motivation Soundtrack| align=left  |”See Saw"
| align=left  |2016
| align=left  |Peace Tunes
|-
| align=left  |Various Artists
| align=left  |Pac Man Riddim| align=left  |”Jah Jah Is Calling"
| align=left  |2016
| align=left  |Kathmandu Productions/House of Riddim
|-
| align=left  |Various Artists
| align=left  |Bay Area Riddim| align=left  |”Traffic Light Dread"
| align=left  |2016
| align=left  |Giddimani Records
|-
| align=left  |Various Artists
| align=left  |Colorful Side Riddim| align=left  |”Power Hungry"
| align=left  |2016
| align=left  |Tidouz Productions
|-
| align=left  |Various Artists
| align=left  |Roots & Kulcha Riddim| align=left  |”Suppen Nuh Right"
| align=left  |2016
| align=left  |Francesco Salteri (Greezzly Productions)
|-
| align=left  |Various Artists
| align=left  |After Berlin Wall Riddim| align=left  |”Concrete Grave"
| align=left  |2016
| align=left  |Martin Kugler (Papa Noah Productions) 
|-
| align=left  |Various Artists
| align=left  |Reelz| align=left  |”Get So High"-(With Perfect Giddimani, Don Tippa, Skarra Mucci)
| align=left  |2016
| align=left  |Weedy G Soundforce/VPAL Music
|-
| align=left  |Various Artists
| align=left  |Sicknature Riddim Selection| align=left  |”Stones and Gems"
| align=left  |2016
| align=left  |Boomrush Productions
|-
| align=left  |Various Artists
| align=left  |Horn of Africa Riddim| align=left  |”Rastafari Way"
| align=left  |2016
| align=left  |Giddimani Records
|-
| align=left  |Various Artists
| align=left  |Lionrock Riddim| align=left  |”Show Respect"
| align=left  |2016
| align=left  |Liontown Records
|-
| align=left  |Various Artists
| align=left  |Zion Bound Riddim| align=left  |”Lightning Earthquake and Thunder"
| align=left  |2016
| align=left  |Francesco Salteri (Greezzly Productions)
|-
| align=left  |Various Artists
| align=left  |Danger Zone Riddim| align=left  |”Do Today"
| align=left  |2016
| align=left  |House of Riddim
|-
| align=left  |Various Artists
| align=left  |Burnhard Spliffington Riddim| align=left  |”Emperor Selassie"
| align=left  |2017
| align=left  |Giddimani Records
|-
| align=left  |Various Artists
| align=left  |Nike Ear Riddim| align=left  |”Home Owner"
| align=left  |2017
| align=left  |Giddimani Records
|-
| align=left  |Various Artists
| align=left  |Kenyakibera Riddim| align=left  |”Walk Away"
| align=left  |2017
| align=left  |Giddimani Records
|-
| align=left  |Various Artists
| align=left  |Agogo Riddim| align=left  |”Poor People" (Don Tippa)
| align=left  |2017
| align=left  |Roots Rebel Sound
|-
| align=left  |Various Artists
| align=left  |Nugs & Kisses Riddim| align=left  |”Calm Down"
| align=left  |2017
| align=left  |Giddimani Records
|-
| align=left  |Various Artists
| align=left  |Like The Wind Riddim| align=left  |”Mankind"
| align=left  |2017
| align=left  |Catchy Record
|-
| align=left  |Various Artists
| align=left  |Hot Fire Riddim| align=left  |”One Big Stone"
| align=left  |2017
| align=left  |Evidence Music
|-
| align=left  |Various Artists
| align=left  |Jah Sazzah Presents Get Up Riddim| align=left  |”Fed Up"
| align=left  |2017
| align=left  |Sazzah Studio Records
|-
| align=left  |Various Artists
| align=left  |Digital Alliance, Vol. 1| align=left  |”Help Everyone"
| align=left  |2018
| align=left  |Napem Records
|-
| align=left  |Various Artists
| align=left  |Time and Tide Riddim| align=left  |”What a Feeling"
| align=left  |2018
| align=left  |Greezzly
|-
| align=left  |Various Artists
| align=left  |Old Jack Plug Riddim| align=left  |”Mental Problem"
| align=left  |2018
| align=left  |Giddimani Records
|-
| align=left  |Various Artists
| align=left  |Chalice Geezas Riddim - EP| align=left  |”Keep Me Away"
| align=left  |2018
| align=left  |Giddimani Records
|-
| align=left  |Various Artists
| align=left  |Mighty Roots Riddim - EP| align=left  |”Ego"
| align=left  |2018
| align=left  |Ambassador Musik Production
|-
| align=left  |Various Artists
| align=left  |Civil Rights Riddim| align=left  |”Forward Black Man"
| align=left  |2018
| align=left  |Giddimani Records
|-
| align=left  |Various Artists
| align=left  |Anti-Racism Riddim| align=left  |”Rastafari Warning"
| align=left  |2018
| align=left  |Giddimani Records
|-
| align=left  |Various Artists
| align=left  |My Favorite DJ Riddim| align=left  |”Rescue"
| align=left  |2019
| align=left  |Giddimani Records
|-
| align=left  |Various Artists
| align=left  |Carry Beyond Riddim - EP| align=left  |”Too Late"
| align=left  |2019
| align=left  |Sazzah Studio Records
|-
| align=left  |Various Artists
| align=left  |Inna We Heart Riddim' - EP'
| align=left  |”First Man"
| align=left  |2019
| align=left  |Ragatac Music
|-
| align=left  |Various Artists
| align=left  |Vinyllionaires Club Riddim
| align=left  |”Attitude of Gratitude"
| align=left  |2019
| align=left  |Giddimani Records
|-
| align=left  |Various Artists
| align=left  |Windrush Generation Riddim
| align=left  |”Rat Trap"
| align=left  |2019
| align=left  |Giddimani Records
|-
| align=left  |Various Artists
| align=left  |Abaddown
| align=left  |”Jah Say"
| align=left  |2019
| align=left  |Evidence Music
|-
| align=left  |Various Artists
| align=left  |Angry Beast Riddim
| align=left  |”Inspired"
| align=left  |2020
| align=left  |Giddimani Records
|-
| align=left  |Various Artists
| align=left  |Dub Club Riddim
| align=left  |”World Crisis"
| align=left  |2020
| align=left  |Giddimani Records
|-
| align=left  |Various Artists
| align=left  |Mama Afrika Riddim
| align=left  |”Train Delay"
| align=left  |2020
| align=left  |Nyah Bless Music
|-
| align=left  |Various Artists
| align=left  |Catch Me Riddim
| align=left  |”Burn Some Marijuana"
| align=left  |2020
| align=left  |Kathmandu Productions.
|-
| align=left  |Various Artists
| align=left  |Rate Who Rate You Riddim
| align=left  |”Band Mind"
| align=left  |2020
| align=left  |Wilmac Records 
|-
| align=left  |Various Artists
| align=left  |Magnifico Riddim
| align=left  |”Lyrical Don Dada"
| align=left  |2021
| align=left  |Greezzly 
|-
| align=left  |Various Artists
| align=left  |Serious Time Riddim
| align=left  |”The Golden Rule"
| align=left  |2021
| align=left  |Kathmandu Productions
|-
|}

Appearances

Official Mixtapes
2015: Rasta Ting – present by Big Mama Sound

Mixtapes Appearances
2005: Young and Sexy Vol 9 –  DJ L and DJ Suss one
2006: Young and Sexy Vol 10 – DJ L and DJ Suss One 
2008: Bad Boys, We Run This – Urban World Wireless and Bad Boy Records
2009: Rise to the top – DJ Mess and Ghetto Youth Sounds 
2009: Austriamaica Vol 1 – by Chiquitaman and San Clemente

External links
Damian Warren a.k.a. Teacha Dee surprises with a fine take on the Beatles' "Ob-La-Di" "Life Goes On", on First Sight Riddim
Reggaeville artiste profile for Teacha Dee
Energy God, Elephant Man Hosts The "Bad Boys: We Run This" Mixtape
Overstand review – Jamaican singer Damian Warren a.k.a. Teacha Dee with his entertaining "Smuggling Weed".
Teacha Dee slated for Ocean Splash on James bond Beach on 20 December 2009
Teacha Dee's latest news blog
Teacha Dee – Rasta Ting – Mixtape – Free Download!

References

1980 births
People from Westmoreland Parish
Jamaican Rastafarians
Reggae fusion artists
Jamaican reggae musicians
Living people
Jamaican male singers
Performers of Rastafarian music
Jamaican dancehall musicians
Converts to the Rastafari movement